Korale Kankanamge Avishka Tharindu Chandima (born 13 September 2001) is a Sri Lankan cricketer. Tharindu has played at under-19 level, setting several records in Sri Lankan school cricket. He made his List A debut on 30 October 2021, for Ragama Cricket Club in the 2021–22 Major Clubs Limited Over Tournament.

In April 2022, Sri Lanka Cricket (SLC) named him in the Sri Lanka Emerging Team's squad for their tour to England. The following month, in the match against Surrey, Tharindu scored his maiden century in a first-class match. On 25 May 2022, during the tour of England, he made his Twenty20 debut, also against Surrey. The following month, he was named in the Sri Lanka A squad for their matches against Australia A during Australia's tour of Sri Lanka.

References

External links
 

2001 births
Living people
Sri Lankan cricketers
Ragama Cricket Club cricketers
Place of birth missing (living people)